Gonatocerus triguttatus is a species of fairyfly. It is an egg parasitoid of the glassy-winged sharpshooter, Homalodisca vitripennis. It was originally described from Caroni County, Trinidad.

References

Mymaridae
Insects described in 1916